German submarine U-525 was a Type IXC/40 U-boat of Nazi Germany's Kriegsmarine built for service during World War II.

Her keel was laid down on 10 September 1941 by the Deutsche Werft in Hamburg as yard number 340. She was launched on 20 May 1942 and commissioned on 30 July with Kapitänleutnant Hans-Joachim Drewitz in command.

The U-boat's service began with training as part of the 4th U-boat Flotilla on 30 July 1942. She then moved to the 10th flotilla on 1 January 1943 for operations.

She was a member of six wolfpacks.

She was sunk by US aircraft, northwest of the Azores on 11 August 1943.

Design
German Type IXC/40 submarines were slightly larger than the original Type IXCs. U-525 had a displacement of  when at the surface and  while submerged. She had two shafts and two  propellers.

U-525 was fitted with six  torpedo tubes (four fitted at the bow and two at the stern), 22 torpedoes, one  SK C/32 naval gun, 180 rounds, and a  SK C/30 as well as a  C/30 anti-aircraft gun. The boat had a complement of forty-eight.

Service history

First patrol
The submarine's first patrol took her from Kiel on 15 December 1942, across the North Sea and into the Atlantic Ocean through the gap between Iceland and the Faroe Islands. She sank Radhurst on 20 February 1943. The ship went down in three minutes.

She arrived at Lorient in occupied France, on 3 March.

Second patrol
Her second foray was relatively uneventful.

Third patrol and loss
Her third sortie took her north and west of the Azores.

She was sunk by depth charges and aerial torpedoes from Avenger and Wildcat aircraft from the American carrier  on 11 August 1943 north-west of the Azores.

Fifty-four men died; there were no survivors.

Wolfpacks
U-525 took part in six wolfpacks, namely:
 Falke (28 December 1942 – 19 January 1943) 
 Haudegen (19 January – 15 February 1943) 
 Amsel (22 April – 3 May 1943) 
 Amsel 3 (3 – 6 May 1943) 
 Rhein (7 – 10 May 1943) 
 Elbe 1 (10 – 14 May 1943)

Summary of raiding history

References

Bibliography

External links

World War II submarines of Germany
German Type IX submarines
1942 ships
U-boats commissioned in 1942
U-boats sunk in 1943
U-boats sunk by depth charges
U-boats sunk by US aircraft
Ships built in Hamburg
Ships lost with all hands
World War II shipwrecks in the Atlantic Ocean
Maritime incidents in August 1943